The Cannonball run is celebrated annually on the Galle Face Green, in Colombo, Sri Lanka to commemorate a misfiring of a British Artillery cannon in 1840.

The 30-pound cannon had misfired during a practice session around the southern ramparts of the Colombo Fort. The ball had deflected after striking a masonry bridge and shot almost a mile down the Green, scoring a direct hit on the roof of the Galle Face Boarding House (now the Galle Face Hotel). It crashed through the roof and ceiling and fell into a drawing room, where landed on the "squared chunam and terra-cotta floor leaving a heavy dent where it rolled under a chair and remained". The British Governor of Ceylon at that time Sir Colin Campbell on hearing of the incident rushed to the scene to view the "mischief" done by "the incredible Cannonball". The cannon ball is preserved in the museum at the "South Wing" of the hotel.

The  event has been marked over the years by the run, which is organised  by the Galle Face Hotel. It begins at the cannon on the Fort end of the Green and ends at the cannonball placed on a pedestal in the hotel. The runners are generally members of the diplomatic community.

External links 
 Annual Cannonball run at Galle Face Hotel

Sports competitions in Sri Lanka
Sport in Colombo